The Clausura 2018 Copa MX Final was the final of the Clausura 2018 Copa MX, the twelfth edition of the Copa MX under its current format and 79th overall organized by the Mexican Football Federation, the governing body of association football in Mexico.

The final was contested in a single leg format between Liga MX clubs Necaxa and Toluca. The match was hosted by Necaxa at Estadio Victoria in Aguascalientes City, Aguascalientes on 11 April 2018. The winners earned a spot to face Monterrey (Apertura 2017 winners) in the 2018 Supercopa MX.

Qualified teams

Venue

Due to the tournament's regulations, the higher seed among both finalists during the group stage will host the final, thus Estadio Victoria hosted the final. The venue has been home to Necaxa since the club relocated from Mexico City in the Apertura 2003 season. The venue has previously hosted various Ascenso MX finals, the most recent being the first leg of the 2015–16 promotional final where they defeated F.C. Juárez 1–0; the team would eventually be promoted to Liga MX after winning 3–0 on aggregate.

Background
Necaxa has won the tournament three times while Toluca has won it twice. Before reaching the final, the last time Necaxa reached a final of any kind was the 2015–16 promotional final where they defeated F.C. Juárez 3–0 on aggregate, that same season the club also lost the Clausura 2016 Copa MX Final to Veracruz. Toluca last reached a final in 2014 where they lost the 2013–14 CONCACAF Champions League Final to Cruz Azul on away goals.

The clubs previously met in a final nearly 20 years earlier where a José Cardozo-led Toluca defeated an Alex Aguinaga-led Necaxa 6–4 on aggregate to capture the Mexican Primera División Verano  1998 championship.

Necaxa, won two, drew one and lost one during the group stage as they were seeded fifth. They eliminated Atlas in the Round of 16, UNAM in the quarterfinals, and Santos Laguna in the semifinals.

Toluca, won two, drew one and lost one during the group stage as they were seeded seventh. They eliminated Oaxaca in the Round of 16, Tapachula in the quarterfinals, and Zacatepec on penalty kicks in the semifinals.

Road to the finals
Note: In all results below, the score of the finalist is given first.

Final

References

Copa MX Finals
2017–18 in Mexican football
2018 in Mexican sports